Drosera pauciflora is a species of sundew, a carnivorous plant from the genus Drosera. It is native to the Western Cape of South Africa. Drosera pauciflora is closely related to Drosera cistiflora. D.pauciflora produces flowers during the spring on a stem coming out of the centre of the rosette, the flowers are pink.

See also 
 List of Drosera species
 Drosera cistiflora

References

pauciflora
Carnivorous plants of Africa